"So High" is a song by American singer John Legend. It was written by Legend along with Paul Cho and DeVon "Devo" Harris for his debut album Get Lifted (2004), while production was helmed by the latter. The song was originally recorded the same year on his third live album, Solo Sessions Vol. 1: Live at the Knitting Factory and is built around a sample of "I Don't Need No Reason" by American band Jr. Walker & The All Stars. Due to the inclusion of the sample, Leon Ware and Pam Sawyer are credited as songwriters. Released as the album's fourth and final single, it peaked at number 53 on the US Billboard Hot R&B/Hip-Hop Songs. Issued along a remix version which features different beats and singer Lauryn Hill on vocals was nominated for a Grammy Award for Best R&B Performance by a Duo or Group with Vocals in 2005.

Track listings

Charts

References

2005 singles
GOOD Music singles
John Legend songs
Lauryn Hill songs
Songs written by John Legend
Songs written by Lauryn Hill
Songs written by Devo Springsteen
Songs written by Leon Ware
Songs written by Pam Sawyer